Bubble Bath Babes is a 1991 adult-oriented puzzle video game developed and published in Asia by C&E for NES. It is one of three adult NES games, unlicensed by Nintendo, and released via mail-order by Panesianalong with Hot Slots and Peek-A-Boo Poker.

The U.S. licensed version from American Video Entertainment, was released in 1991 as Mermaids of Atlantis, with all adult elements removed or obscured. In the same year, a localized version leaving intact those contents was released by Hacker International in Japan as Soap Panic, and still in the U.S. by Panesian.

A Genesis / Mega Drive version was released in 1993 which is more suitable for all ages.

Gameplay

Gameplay is reminiscent of Tetris (1984) and the succeeding Puzzle Bobble (1994). The goal is to steer clusters of rising bubbles and place them so that they connect to others with a matching color along the top screen part. If a sufficient number of similar bubbles are touching, they will be cleared and all free neighboring bubbles will rise further, allowing for combos. If the accumulated bubbles on the screen reach the playing bottom area, it reaches game over. Finally, when a level is completed the player is rewarded with erotica.

Reception
Computer and Video Games said "The limited graphics make the sauciness factor rubbish".

Allgame gave a retrospective score of 2.5 out of 5 stars, saying "Bubble Bath Babes is most notable for being one of three NES games to feature nudity, but its bubble-matching gameplay is good enough to keep it from being just a novelty. Unfortunately, the mild adult content overwhelms the aura of the game, even though it is a small part of the overall package. The topless woman at the bottom of the screen is tastefully depicted, but her inclusion is ultimately gratuitous since she has no effect on the action."

References

External links
 
 Most Expensive NES Games
 Bubble Bath Babes on GameFAQs
 5 things you don't know about Nintendo at GamerNoize.com

1991 video games
Erotic video games
Unauthorized video games
Nintendo Entertainment System games
Nintendo Entertainment System-only games
Puzzle video games
Video games developed in Taiwan
Video game clones
Single-player video games
Sega Genesis games
American Video Entertainment games
C&E games